Foxcon may refer to:
 Foxcon Aviation, an Australian aircraft manufacturer
 Foxconn, a Taiwanese computer manufacturer, also known formally as the Hon Hai Precision Industry Co., Ltd.